Harry Reid (1939–2021) was an American politician who served as the senior United States senator from Nevada, from 1987 to 2017.

Harry Reid may also refer to:

People 
 Harry Reid (bishop) (1866–1943), Bishop of Edinburgh
 Harry Avery Reid (1877–1947), Director of Veterinary Services in New Zealand
 Harry Fielding Reid (1859–1944), American geophysicist
 Harry Reid (journalist) (born 1947), Scottish journalist and author
 Harry Reid (actor) (born 1992), British actor

Transport 
 Harry Reid International Airport, aiport serving Las Vegas, Nevada, U.S.

See also
Henry Reid, former director of UCLA's willed body program who sold donated body parts to drug companies 
Henry Reed (disambiguation)
Harold Reid (born 1939), former bass singer for the country vocal group The Statler Brothers